The Cincinnati Limited was a named train of the Pennsylvania Railroad; the train traveled from  New York City's Pennsylvania Station to the Cincinnati Union Terminal. It was a rival to New York Central's Ohio State Limited. The Cincinnati Limited carried connecting sleeping cars to the Louisville and Nashville Railroad's Cincinnati to New Orleans Pan American. By the mid-1950s, the sleeper extension on L&N lines ended at Memphis instead of New Orleans.

The train was sustained into the era of the Penn Central, the successor of the Pennsylvania Railroad. Both the Cincinnati Limited and the Pan American ended service on April 30, 1971, as passenger trains moved over to Amtrak.

Stations west of Harrisburg
The train ran at limited stations from Pittsburgh to Columbus, in comparison to the PRR's Penn Texas which bypassed most of them.''
Lewistown station (westbound only)
Altoona station
Pittsburgh Union Station
Steubenville (eastbound only)
Columbus Union Station
Xenia (westbound only)
Norwood
Winton Place
Cincinnati Union Terminal

References 

Named passenger trains of the United States
Night trains of the United States
Passenger trains of the Pennsylvania Railroad
Railway services discontinued in 1971
Passenger rail transportation in Pennsylvania
Passenger rail transportation in New York (state)
Passenger rail transportation in New Jersey
Passenger rail transportation in Ohio